Anyika Onuora  (born 28 October 1984) is a retired British sprint track and field athlete who competed in the  100 metres, 200 metres and 400 metres, and also the 4×100 metres relay and 4x400 metres relay.

Specialising in the short sprints and sprint relays in her early career, and despite being part of the Great Britain 4 x 100 metres relay team that took gold at the 2014 European Athletics Championships, a move on her coaches suggestion to the longer 400 sprint and relay in her later career led to her most significant individual and relay successes. In the 4 x 400 metres relay, she won a World Championship bronze medal in 2015, while in 2016 an individual bronze in the 400 metres, and relay gold in the 4 x 400 metres relay at the European Championships were followed by an Olympic bronze medal in the 4 x 400 metres relay.

Career

Her first major junior international competition was the 2003 European Athletics Junior Championships, where she finished fifth in the 100 m event and won a silver medal with the British 4×100 metres relay team. She competed in her first major senior tournaments in 2006: at the Melbourne Commonwealth Games she reached the semi-finals of the 100 m and won her second silver medal in the 4×100 m relay with the English team. Five months later at her first European Athletics Championships, she achieved the same feat again, reaching the individual semi-finals and taking another silver medal with the relay team. She also competed in the 2006 IAAF World Cup, representing Europe, but finished last, despite recording a season's best for the team. A technical lane mix-up with the United States team resulted in a poor performance for the British team and disqualification for the American team.

Onuora was chosen to represent Great Britain at the 2008 Beijing Olympics as a back-up runner in the relay team; however, ultimately she did not compete for the team.

She competed at the 2009 Manchester City Games in a 150 metres street race, winning the "B" final of the women's event.

On 28 August 2014, she helped set the British record in the Women's 4 × 100 m running the 3rd leg, alongside Asha Philip, Ashleigh Nelson and Desiree Henry in the Diamond League in Zurich. This broke the British record set 11 days before at the 2014 European Athletics Championships.

She was a member of the bronze medal winning British women's 4 × 400 metres relay team at the 2016 Rio Olympics.

Personal life
She was born to Nigerian parents. She is the sister of former footballer Iffy Onuora and the academic Emy Onuora, author of the 2015 book Pitch Black, on the experiences of black British footballers.

In October 2015, 10 months before winning her bronze medal in Rio 2016, Onuora had become severely unwell from malaria after visiting her late father's home village in Nigeria. Few of her fellow GB athletes were aware that she had been unwell and could not walk due to illness, never mind train in preparation for the Rio Olympics selection trials. Despite this, she qualified for the Olympics, and by 2016 had recovered sufficiently to win gold and bronze medals in Amsterdam and Rio.

Personal bests

All information taken from IAAF profile.

References

External links
 
 
 
 
 
 

1984 births
Living people
Sportspeople from Liverpool
English female sprinters
British female sprinters
Olympic female sprinters
Olympic athletes of Great Britain
Olympic bronze medallists for Great Britain
Olympic bronze medalists in athletics (track and field)
Athletes (track and field) at the 2012 Summer Olympics
Athletes (track and field) at the 2016 Summer Olympics
Medalists at the 2016 Summer Olympics
Commonwealth Games silver medallists for England
Commonwealth Games bronze medallists for England
Commonwealth Games medallists in athletics
Athletes (track and field) at the 2006 Commonwealth Games
Athletes (track and field) at the 2014 Commonwealth Games
Athletes (track and field) at the 2018 Commonwealth Games
World Athletics Championships athletes for Great Britain
World Athletics Championships medalists
World Athletics Indoor Championships medalists
European Athletics Championships winners
British Athletics Championships winners
European Athletics Championships medalists
English people of Nigerian descent
Black British sportswomen
Medallists at the 2006 Commonwealth Games
Medallists at the 2014 Commonwealth Games